Dimitrios Popovits (born 11 February 1995) is a Serbian-born Greek professional footballer who plays as a winger for Super League Greece 2 club Almopos Aridea.

Club career 

Popovits started his career in Serres with Panserraikos, before signed 2009 for PAOK in Thessaloniki. He played his debut in the Football League on 21 January 2012 for PAOK against Panionios. Popovic played three games for PAOK, before left the club to join Platanias on loan in August 2013. By Platanias played nine games and returned in December 2013 to PAOK, which loaned him against out, now to Apollon Kalamarias. On 20 August 2015, he signed a year contract with Panserraikos as a loan from PAOK, but he didn't finish the year with the club as he signed with Cypriot club Karmiotissa. On 8 July 2016, he signed a three years' contract with Regionalliga Südwest club Waldhof Mannheim for an undisclosed fee, while PAOK kept a 30% of his next transfer value. On 28 January 2017, he signed with Regionalliga Südwest club Koblenz as a free transfer till 30 June 2018. In July 2019, he signed with Fortuna Liga club Zemplín Michalovce.

International career 

The left winger is part of the Greece national under-20 football team and was previously part of the U17, U18 and U20.

References

External links
 

Living people
1995 births
Footballers from Frankfurt
Greek footballers
Greek expatriate footballers
Greece youth international footballers
Association football midfielders
PAOK FC players
Platanias F.C. players
Panserraikos F.C. players
Super League Greece players
Karmiotissa FC players
Cypriot Second Division players
Expatriate footballers in Cyprus
Greek expatriate sportspeople in Cyprus
SV Waldhof Mannheim players
TuS Koblenz players
FC Viktoria Köln players
Regionalliga players
Expatriate footballers in Germany
Greek expatriate sportspeople in Germany
MFK Zemplín Michalovce players
Slovak Super Liga players
Greek expatriate sportspeople in Slovakia
Expatriate footballers in Slovakia